Esterino Montino (born 6 April 1948), is an Italian politician.

Biography 
A Senator during the 14th and the 15th legislatures of Italy, Montino has been the Vice-president of Regional Administration of Lazio, deputy of President Piero Marrazzo since 2005, and councilor for Town Planning. Since the presidential resignation of October 27, 2009, he took the provisional regency of the administration until the planned election of March 2010.

He is married with politician Monica Cirinnà.

In 2013 he has been elected mayor of Fiumicino, and has been re-elected in 2018.

External links 
 Italian Senate: Esterino Montino

References 

Living people
Democrats of the Left politicians
Democratic Party (Italy) politicians
21st-century Italian politicians
Members of the Senate of the Republic (Italy)
1942 births